Berenice Guzmán (born 8 August 1975) is a Mexican former synchronized swimmer who competed in the 1996 Summer Olympics.

References

1975 births
Living people
Mexican synchronized swimmers
Olympic synchronized swimmers of Mexico
Synchronized swimmers at the 1996 Summer Olympics